Dalweyn is a town in the Bari province of the autonomous Puntland region in northeastern Somalia.

History
The town was first established by Bile Nuur, a well-known leader hailing from the Reer Zakariye sub-clan of the Dashiishe Darod.

Geography
Dalweyn is situated about 140 kilometres south of Bosaso, near the district of Waiye. It is strategically located and is rich in natural resources.

Demographics
The town has a population of about 800 inhabitants.

References
Dalweyn - Somalia

Populated places in Bari, Somalia